Following the proclamation of the Republic, Turkish museums developed considerably, mainly due to the importance Atatürk had attached to the research and exhibition of artifacts of Anatolia. When the Republic of Turkey was proclaimed, there were only the İstanbul Archaeology Museum called the "Asar-ı Atika Müzesi", the Istanbul Military Museum housed in the St. Irene Church, the Islamic Museum (Evkaf-ı Islamiye Müzesi) in the Suleymaniye Complex in Istanbul and the smaller museums of the Ottoman Empire Museum (Müze-i Humayun) in a few large cities of Anatolia.

The Turkish Archaeological Museum (Türk Asar-ı Atikası), which was established during the first years of the Republic, carried out studies to gather, collate, catalogue and protect archaeological and ethnographical finds. In many provinces of Anatolia, monumental buildings such as ancient churches, mosques and caravanserais were restored and converted into museums. Topkapı Palace, which was converted into a museum with the furniture and works of art on the premises, was opened to the public in 1927. The same year, the Islamic Museum was reorganized as the "Museum  of  Turkish  and Islamic Works of Art" and the Mevlana Dervish Lodge in Konya was also converted into a museum.

The construction of the Ankara Ethnographical Museum, the first building designed as a museum, was completed in 1930. New museums were established in Bursa, Adana, Manisa, Izmir, Kayseri, Antalya, Afyon, Bergama, and Edirne. The Hittite Museum, which was established in the Mahmut Pasha Bedesten in Ankara in 1940, was restored and renovated and converted into "Museum of Anatolian Civilizations” in 1968.

Today, there are 99 museum directorates attached to the Ministry of Culture and Tourism, 151 private museums in 36 provinces and 1,204 private collections.

List of museums

Adana

Adana Archaeological Museum
Adana Cinema Museum
Adana Ethnography Museum
Atatürk Museum
Misis Mosaic Museum

Adıyaman
Adıyaman Archaeological Museum

Afyonkarahisar
Afyonkarahisar Archaeological Museum
Victory Museum
Atatürk's House (Şuhut)

Aksaray
Aksaray Museum

Amasya Museum
Amasya Museum

Ankara

Antalya

Alanya Archaeological Museum
Antalya Museum
Atatürk's House Museum (Antalya)

Artvin
Dikyamaç Museum

Aydın
Aydın Archaeological Museum

Balıkesir
Balıkesir National Struggle Museum
Burhaniye National Forces Culture Museum
Tahtakuşlar Ethnography Museum

Bartın
Amasra Museum

Batman
Batman Museum
Hasankeyf Cultural Park

Bayburt
 Baksı Museum

Bilecik
Bilecik Museum
Söğüt Ertuğrul Gazi Museum

Bolu
Bolu Museum

Burdur
Burdur Archaeological Museum

Bursa

Bursa Archaeological Museum
Bursa Atatürk Museum
Bursa Energy Museum
Bursa Forestry Museum
Bursa Karagöz Museum
Bursa Museum of Turkish and Islamic Art
Mudanya Armistice House

Çanakkale
 Adatepe Olive Oil Museum
 Archaeological Museum of Çanakkale
 Ceramics Museum of Çanakkale
 Troy Museum

Denizli
Denizli Museum

Diyarbakır
Ahmet Arif Literature Museum Library
Cahit Sıtkı Tarancı Museum
Diyarbakır Museum
Ziya Gökalp Museum

Düzce

Konuralp Museum

Edirne
Edirne Museum

Elazığ
Elazığ Archaeology and Ethnography Museum

Erzincan
Ali Demirsoy Natural History Museum

Eskişehir
Eskişehir Aviation Museum
Eskişehir Caricature Museum
Eskişehir Museum
Eskişehir Meerschaum Museum
Eskişehir Wax Museum
İnönü Military Quarter and War Museum
M.S.Ö. Air & Space Museum
Museum of Independence, Eskişehir
Museum of Modern Glass Art, Eskişehir
Museum of woodworking
Tülomsaş Museum

Gaziantep

Gaziantep Museum of Archaeology
Zeugma Mosaic Museum

Giresun
Giresun Museum

Hatay

 Hatay Archaeology Museum
İskenderun Naval Museum

Isparta
Isparta Museum

Iğdır 
Iğdır Genocide Memorial and Museum

İstanbul

İzmir
Ahmed Adnan Saygun Arts Center
Avrasya Anı Evi (Eurasia Memorial House)
Bergama Museum
Çamlık Railway Museum
Çeşme Museum
Natural History Museum of Ege University
İzmir Archaeological Museum
İzmir Atatürk Museum
İnciraltı Sea Museum
İzmir Art and Sculpture Museum
Izmir Ethnography Museum
İzmir Toy Museum
Ödemiş Museum
Tire City Museum

Kahramanmaraş
Kahramanmaraş Archaeology Museum
Kahramanmaraş Liberation Museum

Karaman
Karaman Museum

Karabük
Karabük Kardemir Iron-Steel Museum

Kars
Boğatepe Cheese Museum
Kars Museum

Kastamonu
Kastamonu Ethnography Museum

Kayseri
Kayseri Archaeology Museum

Kırıkkale
Kırıkkale MKE Weapons Industry Museum

Kırşehir
Kırşehir Museum

Kilis
Kilis Museum

Kocaeli
Kocaeli Museum
SEKA Paper Museum
Osman Hamdi Bey Museum

Konya

Akşehir Museum
Ereğli Museum
Konya Archaeological Museum
Konya Ethnography Museum
Mevlana Museum
Sahip Ata Museum

Kütahya
Kütahya Archaeological Museum

Malatya
Camera Museum
Malatya Museum

Manisa
Akhisar Museum
Manisa Archaeological Museum

Mardin
Mardin Museum

Mersin

Muğla Museum
Milas Museum
Muğla Museum

Nevşehir
Nevşehir Museum

Niğde
Niğde Archaeological Museum

Ordu
Ordu Ethnographical Museum

Osmaniye
Karatepe-Aslantaş Open-Air Museum
Osmaniye City Museum

Rize
Rize Atatürk Museum

Sakarya 
Sakarya Museum

Samsun
Alaçam Exchange Museum
Samsun Atatürk Museum

Sinop
Sinop Museum

Sivas

Sivas Congress and Ethnography Museum

Şanlıurfa
Şanlıurfa Archaeology and Mosaic Museum

Tekirdağ
Kutman Wine Museum
Namık Kemal House Museum
Rákóczi Museum
Tekirdağ Museum of Archaeology and Ethnography

Tokat
Tokat Museum

Trabzon

Hagia Sophia, Trabzon
Trabzon Museum
Sumela Monastery

Uşak
Uşak Museum of Archaeology

Yozgat
Yozgat Museum

References

 
Lists of buildings and structures in Turkey
Turkey
Lists of tourist attractions in Turkey
Turkey
Turkey